Seymour is a city in Wayne County, Iowa, United States. The population was 634 at the time of the 2020 census.

History
The first coal mines in Seymour were opened in 1884. In 1902, the Numa Block Coal Company took over these mines.  In 1908 the largest coal mine in Appanoose-Wayne Coalfield was Numa Block number 2, known as "Big Jim." "Big Jim" was located just 1 mile east of the Chicago, Milwaukee and St. Paul Railway Depot, and was able to produce 100,000 tons of coal per year at full capacity.  The Mystic coal seam was just over 2 feet thick here, reached by a 202-foot long shaft.  Numa Block Mine number 3, the Sunshine Mine, was in the southeast part of town, served by the Rock Island, with a 240-foot long shaft to the Mystic seam.

In 1884, Local Assembly 3143 of the Knights of Labor, based in Seymour, had 40 members.  In 1912, United Mine Workers Local 206 in Seymour had 299 members, approximately 13% of the entire population.

On March 6, 2017 an EF-2 tornado (confirmed by National Weather Service WFO, Des Moines, IA damage survey) hit Seymour at approximately 8:00 pm CST, damaging homes and the high school.

Geography
Seymour is located at  (40.682854, −93.120732).

Transportation
Seymour is served by a county-maintained road which used to be Iowa Highway 55 and is now County Road S60.

Seymour is served by the Canadian Pacific Railway which currently operates the former Milwaukee Railroad tracks.

Seymour was also served by the CRI&P (Rock Island) until the early 1980s.  This line passed on the southwest corner of the town square with the depot in this location.  This line was abandoned when the Rock Island went bankrupt.  It used to be part of the Golden State Route which was a luxury passenger train operated by the Rock Island and the Southern Pacific.

The two railroad lines crossed at the western edge of Seymour and was protected by an interlocking tower until the Rock Island was abandoned.

Demographics

2010 census
As of the census of 2010, there were 701 people, 295 households, and 192 families residing in the city. The racial makeup of the city was 98.7% White, 0.4% Asian, and 0.9% from two or more races. Hispanic or Latino of any race were 1.6% of the population.

There were 295 households, of which 26.1% had children under the age of 18 living with them, 45.1% were married couples living together, 16.3% had a female householder with no husband present, 3.7% had a male householder with no wife present, and 34.9% were non-families. 30.5% of all households were made up of individuals, and 13.3% had someone living alone who was 65 years of age or older. The average household size was 2.38 and the average family size was 2.80.

The median age in the city was 47.1 years. 20.8% of residents were under the age of 18; 7.3% were between the ages of 18 and 24; 20% were from 25 to 44; 27.4% were from 45 to 64; and 24.5% were 65 years of age or older. The gender makeup of the city was 48.5% male and 51.5% female.

2000 census
As of the census of 2000, there were 810 people, 336 households, and 219 families residing in the city. The racial makeup of the city was 97.53% White, 0.37% Native American, 0.99% from other races, and 1.11% from two or more races. Hispanic or Latino of any race were 2.10% of the population.

There were 336 households, out of which 27.1% had children under the age of 18 living with them, 53.3% were married couples living together, 8.9% had a female householder with no husband present, and 34.8% were non-families. 31.5% of all households were made up of individuals, and 17.3% had someone living alone who was 65 years of age or older. The average household size was 2.30 and the average family size was 2.89.

In the city, the population was spread out, with 23.0% under the age of 18, 6.4% from 18 to 24, 24.9% from 25 to 44, 20.9% from 45 to 64, and 24.8% who were 65 years of age or older. The median age was 42 years. For every 100 females, there were 91.0 males. For every 100 females age 18 and over, there were 90.8 males.

The median income for a household in the city was $26,172, and the median income for a family was $32,692. Males had a median income of $24,531 versus $20,833 for females. The per capita income for the city was $13,581. About 12.7% of families and 22.0% of the population were below the poverty line, including 37.3% of those under age 18 and 12.3% of those age 65 or over.

Education
The Seymour Community School District operates local area public schools.

Notable people
 John C. Mabee, Thoroughbred racehorse owner/breeder
 Marcus Collins, actor and singer part of The Texas Tenors

References

Cities in Wayne County, Iowa
Cities in Iowa
1884 establishments in Iowa